James Robert Provett (born 22 December 1982) is an English former footballer who played as a goalkeeper in the Football League for Hartlepool United and Bury.

Playing career
Jim Provett came through Hartlepool United's youth development programme, the same programme that developed players such as Adam Boyd and Antony Sweeney. It was there where he developed into a good shot-stopper and he was offered a professional contract by the then manager Chris Turner in 2001. Provett's professional contract saw the departure of Martin Hollund who was released.

In 2002, Provett made his debut against Tranmere Rovers in the Football League Trophy. However, during his debut he conceded five goals. For the remainder of the season Provett struggled to dislodge Anthony Williams who played in all of Hartlepool's league games.

During the following 2003–04 season Provett was handed his opportunity to impress in the League Cup against Sheffield Wednesday. During this match he made a save during a penalty shoot out to win Hartlepool the match. He kept his place in the team for the remainder of the season and was named the Hartlepool's Players' Player and Fans' Player of the Season.

For the start of the 2004–05 season Provett was given the number one goalkeepers shirt. He started the first few games of the season but soon faced stiff competition from Dimitrious Konstantopolous who eventually overtook him as Hartlepool's first choice keeper. As the season approached its final quarter Provett handed in a transfer request due to lack of first team appearances. However, he withdrew this request the week before Hartlepool played the second leg of the play-off semi-final.

After failing to make the first team for the following two seasons, Provett stalled on a new contract. However, before he resigned Hartlepool withdrew their offer and he left the club. In July 2007, he joined Bury on trial. After passing a medical, Provett joined Bury and was their new number one keeper. He was released by Bury FC after making 41 appearances for the club at the end of the 2007–08 season.

On 3 July 2008, Harrogate Town released the news that Provett had signed for them. He became the number 1 for Harrogate Town and made a reputation for producing great save after great save. However, due to cost-cutting measures the entire Harrogate squad was put up for sale. Provett was transferred to Gateshead on 11 February 2009. After making 19 appearances (including 1 game in 2009 against Chester City, whose record was expunged that season), Gateshead released Provett after the 2009–10 season. Provett went on to join Norton and Stockton Ancients of the Northern League. In addition to playing football, he went on to train budding goalkeepers for 'Just4Keepers', founded by former Everton goalkeeper Ray Newland.

In the summer of 2013 he left Norton to rejoin Hartlepool United, this time as goalkeeper coach, taking over from Andy Collett, who left to take up the same role with York City. In the 2014 close season, he joined Darlington as goalkeeping player-coach. Provett left Darlington in 2016.

Honours
Individual
Hartlepool United Player of the Year: 2004

References

External links

Harrogate Town Profile
Jim Provett's PoolsOnline.tk profile
Jim Provett joins Harrogate Town

1982 births
Living people
People from Trimdon
Footballers from County Durham
English footballers
Association football goalkeepers
Hartlepool United F.C. players
Bury F.C. players
Harrogate Town A.F.C. players
Gateshead F.C. players
Norton & Stockton Ancients F.C. players
Darlington F.C. players
English Football League players
National League (English football) players
Northern Football League players
Hartlepool United F.C. non-playing staff
Darlington F.C. non-playing staff